The 2016–17 Minnesota Wild season was the 17th season for the National Hockey League franchise that was established on June 25, 1997.

Standings

Schedule and results

Pre-season

Regular season

Playoffs

Player statistics
Final Stats

Skaters

Goaltenders

†Denotes player spent time with another team before joining the Wild.  Stats reflect time with the Wild only.
‡Traded mid-season

Awards and honours

Awards

Milestones

Transactions
The Wild have been involved in the following transactions during the 2016–17 season.

Trades

Free agents acquired

Free agents lost

Claimed via waivers

Lost via waivers

Player signings

Draft picks

Below are the Minnesota Wild's selections at the 2016 NHL Entry Draft, held on June 24–25, 2016 at the First Niagara Center in Buffalo.

Draft notes

 The Minnesota Wild's second-round pick went to the Chicago Blackhawks as the result of a trade on June 24, 2016 that sent Andrew Shaw to Montreal in exchange for a second-round pick in 2016 (39th overall) and this pick.
Montreal previously acquired this pick as the result of a trade on July 1, 2014 that sent Josh Gorges to Buffalo in exchange for this pick.
Buffalo previously acquired this pick as the result of a trade on March 5, 2014 that sent Matt Moulson and Cody McCormick to Minnesota in exchange for Torrey Mitchell, Winnipeg's second-round pick in 2014 and this pick.

The Minnesota Wild's third-round pick went to the Nashville Predators as the result of a trade on June 20, 2016 that sent Jimmy Vesey to Buffalo in exchange for this pick.
Buffalo previously acquired this pick as the result of a trade on February 29, 2016 that sent Jamie McGinn to Anaheim in exchange for this pick (being conditional at the time of the trade). The condition – Buffalo will receive a third-round pick in 2016 if Anaheim does not qualify for the 2016 Western Conference Final – was converted on April 27, 2016 when Anaheim was eliminated from the 2016 Stanley Cup playoffs.
Anaheim previously acquired this pick as the result of a trade on June 26, 2015 that sent Kyle Palmieri to New Jersey in exchange for Florida's second-round pick in 2015 and this pick (being conditional at the time of the trade). The condition – Anaheim will receive the higher of either Florida or Minnesota's third-round pick in 2016. – was converted on April 24, 2016 when Minnesota was eliminated from the 2016 Stanley Cup playoffs ensuring that the Wild's pick would be higher than Florida's.
New Jersey previously acquired this pick as the result of a trade on February 26, 2015 that sent Jaromir Jagr to Florida in exchange for a second-round pick in 2015 and this pick.
Florida previously acquired this pick as the result of a trade on February 24, 2015 that sent Sean Bergenheim and a seventh-round pick in 2016 to Minnesota in exchange for this pick.

 The Minnesota Wild's fifth-round pick went to the Boston Bruins as the result of a trade on June 27, 2015 that sent a fifth-round pick in 2015 to Minnesota in exchange for this pick.
 The Minnesota Wild's sixth-round pick went to the Calgary Flames as the result of a trade on February 29, 2016 that sent David Jones to Minnesota in exchange for Niklas Backstrom and this pick.
 The Florida Panthers' seventh-round pick went to the Minnesota Wild as the result of a trade on February 24, 2015 that sent a third-round pick in 2016 to Florida in exchange for Sean Bergenheim and this pick.

References

Minnesota Wild seasons
Minnesota Wild
Minnesota Wild
Minnesota Wild